Ahmed Saleem is a Maldivian diplomat who is currently serving as Ambassador-at-Large at the Ministry of Foreign Affairs of Maldives. Previously, he was the 11th Secretary-General of the South Asian Association for Regional Cooperation (SAARC) from 2012 to 2014. From May 2015 to February 2020 he served as High Commissioner of Maldives to Pakistan and non-resident Ambassador accredited to Nepal.

Early years and education 
Saleem was educated in Malé, Maldives and in New Delhi, India.

Diplomatic career 
Saleem joined the Maldivian Ministry of Foreign Affairs in 1968. He had a distinguished career spanning for more than 30 years, during which he served in various capacities in the Ministry, such as Controller of Immigration & Emigration, Chief of Protocol, Under-Secretary (Head of the Multilateral Department) and Secretary. As a career diplomat, Saleem served at the Maldives’ High Commission in Sri Lanka and Permanent Mission in New York, two of only few diplomatic missions Maldives had at the time. During his deputation to the Ministry of Finance for one year in 1977, he became his Government's first Alternate Governor for the World Bank, International Development Association (IDA) and Asian Development Bank (ADB). From 1990 to 1993, he served as the first Director from Maldives at the SAARC Secretariat, Kathmandu, Nepal.

Mr Saleem presented credentials to the President of Pakistan as Maldives High Commissioner in Pakistan on 12 June 2015. Subsequently, he presented credentials to the President of Nepal on 29 February 2016 as Non-Resident Maldivian Ambassador to Nepal. Since February 2020, Mr. 
Saleem is Ambassador-at-Large at the Ministry of Foreign Affairs of the Maldives.

Democracy and human rights 

Saleem has been a strong advocate of democracy and human rights.
During his presidency of the Human Rights Commission of Maldives (HRCM) from 2007 to 2010, Saleem played a crucial role in raising awareness about the values of democracy and human rights in the country, which became a democracy in 2008.
Saleem was one of the original nine members when the HRCM was first established by the Presidential decree on 10 December 2003, five years before the first democratic constitution came into force in 2008 in the Maldives. Subsequently in 2006, Saleem was appointed by the Maldivian Parliament as the President of the newly constituted HRCM, a fully autonomous body under the Maldivian law and in full conformity with the Paris Principles. He served in that capacity until August 2010.

Having contributed many writings both in Dhivehi and English, Saleem's role in the promotion of democracy and human rights in the Maldives is widely recognized.
The fact that the first HRCM was established five years before democracy came to the country, made it extremely difficult for the HRCM to carry out its mandatory functions. Maldives, a country that has never ever experienced democracy in its entire history, was not quite ready to embrace democracy and therefore criticizing or condemning the Government on any issue was tantamount to committing a crime that prompted verbal and physical attacks and threats on members of the HRCM. Partly as a result, most of the members of the HRCM resigned on one pretext or the other. However, Saleem was one of the two members, who refused to quit and remained until the HRCM became an autonomous body in November 2006. 
It was the HRCM which taught the Maldivians that they had a right to free speech and also criticize the Government. Meetings held by the HRCM for advocating human rights and the rule of law and for creating a culture of dialogue among the newly created political parties, were welcomed by the opposition, while the Government resisted them.
  
HRCM also played a crucial role in internationalizing the human rights atrocities that had taken place in jails. An uprising by convicts in the major jail close to the capital of Malé in 2004, which resulted in the brutal killing of one of the inmates by the police, prompted the anti-government demonstrations, paving the way for the Maldives to turn into a democratic country in 2008.

Secretary-General of SAARC 
Established in December 1985, SAARC is the regional grouping of eight member states in South Asia. Its primary objective is to promote the welfare of its peoples and to improve their quality of life through regional cooperation. A strong believer of regional cooperation, Saleem took over as the Secretary-General of SAARC in March 2012. Saleem firmly believes that SAARC is the best thing to have happened to South Asia. He holds the conviction that SAARC is the only vehicle that can contribute to peace and harmony in the region through effective economic integration. It was during Saleem's tenure as Secretary-General of SAARC that, for the first time in the history of SAARC, a comprehensive study to strengthen SAARC mechanisms, including the Secretariat, 11 regional centres and SAARC socialized bodies, was conducted.

Career highlights 
There are several firsts to Saleem's credit. Following Maldives’ independence in 1965, Saleem was one among the first batch of diplomats to have joined the Maldivian Foreign Ministry. In 1977, he was the first Alternative Governor of Maldives for the World Bank, International Development Association (IDA) and Asian Development Bank (ADB) during his deputation to the Ministry of Finance in 1977. He was the first Director from Maldives to have served the SAARC Secretariat from 1990 to 1993. He was also the first ever member approved by the Maldivian Parliament for an independent commission in the Maldives.

Personal life 
Saleem was born on 26 May 1949 in Male, the capital of Maldives. He is married to Ayesha Saleem. They have two daughters and two sons. He has been a keen sportsman throughout his life. At national level, he played competitions in football, tennis and cricket. Even today, he follows these sports and plays tennis regularly. A prolific writer, he has contributed many articles on regional and international affairs.

References

High Commissioners of the Maldives to Pakistan
Living people
People from Malé
1949 births
Secretaries General of the South Asian Association for Regional Cooperation